Meung Yum is a Waic language spoken by about 8,000 people in Kunlong Township, Shan State, Myanmar.

Comparing Meung Yum data from Namt Yoke, Loi Yang, Pang Wan, and Pan Tang villages,  has determined Meung Yum to be a variety of Wa.

Names
Other names for Meung Yum include Kon Loi, Loi, Wa Chu, Wa, Awa, and La.

Demographics
Meung Yum speakers live in Kunlong Township (with 21 Meung Yum villages) and Hopang Township (with 30 Meung Yum villages), with each township having about an equal number of speakers.

Nine villages have only Meung Yum people:
Kunlong Township
Namt Yoke
Pang Khaw
Pang Wan
Man Pein
Pa Paw
Kaung Sang
Man Kan
Wa State
Meung Yum
Noat Awng

Meung Yum dialects are Kaung Sar, Pan Tan, Man Kyu, Man Phan, Namt Yoke, Man Pein, Kaung Sang, and Man Kan.   also lists Loi Yang, Pang Wan, and Pan Tang.

See also
Savaiq language

References

Works cited

 
 

Palaungic languages